David Kimutai Rotich (born 19 August 1969), is a race walker from Kenya. He is an African Champion, All-Africa Games winner, Commonwealth Games medalist and has competed twice at the Olympics.

Kimutai was born in Sotik. He began his athletics career by competing in long distance running, particularly 10000 metres, but without much success. He then switched to race walking. His personal record in 20 km walk (1:20:40) was set at the Kenyan Championships in 1996.

International competitions

References

External links

1969 births
Living people
People from Bomet County
Kenyan male racewalkers
Olympic athletes of Kenya
Athletes (track and field) at the 1996 Summer Olympics
Athletes (track and field) at the 2000 Summer Olympics
Athletes (track and field) at the 2008 Summer Olympics
Commonwealth Games medallists in athletics
Athletes (track and field) at the 1998 Commonwealth Games
Athletes (track and field) at the 2002 Commonwealth Games
Athletes (track and field) at the 2006 Commonwealth Games
Athletes (track and field) at the 2010 Commonwealth Games
Athletes (track and field) at the 2015 African Games
World Athletics Championships athletes for Kenya
Commonwealth Games bronze medallists for Kenya
African Games gold medalists for Kenya
African Games medalists in athletics (track and field)
21st-century Kenyan people
Medallists at the 2002 Commonwealth Games